Cà Mau is a province of Vietnam, named after its capital city. It is located in the Mekong Delta of southern Vietnam, and is the southernmost of Vietnam's 63 provinces. It is bordered to the north by Kiên Giang and Bạc Liêu provinces, to the west by the Gulf of Thailand, and to the south and east by the South China Sea.

Economy
Being surrounded by water on three sides, fishing is an important industry in Cà Mau province. An extensive network of canals also supports a strong agricultural sector, as well as providing a popular means of transport. The U Minh biosphere reserve and Mũi Cà Mau, the southernmost point of Vietnam, serve also as important tourist destinations. The Mũi Cà Mau National Park is located at Mũi Cà Mau.

Administrative divisions

Cà Mau is subdivided into nine district-level sub-divisions:

8 districts:

 Cái Nước
 Đầm Dơi
 Năm Căn
 Ngọc Hiển
 Phú Tân
 Thới Bình
 Trần Văn Thời
 U Minh

1 provincial city:
 Cà Mau (capital)

They are further subdivided into nine commune-level towns (or townlets), 82 communes, and 10 wards.

Typhoon Linda (1997)
In November 1997, the Cà Mau Peninsula was struck by Typhoon Linda (Openg). Thousands of people were killed, and an estimated 200,000 homes were destroyed, along with much of the Cà Mau fishing fleet.

References

External links
Official website

 
Gulf of Thailand
Provinces of Vietnam